Christian Groh is an American businessman, and one of the co-founders of Privateer Holdings, along with Brendan Kennedy and Michael Blue.

Early life
Groh earned a bachelor's degree from California Maritime Academy, and an MBA from San Francisco State University.

Career
Groh previously worked at SVB Analytics, an affiliate of Silicon Valley Bank, as did Brendan Kennedy.

References

Living people
American billionaires
American company founders
San Francisco State University alumni
Year of birth missing (living people)